Aphelenchoides subtenuis is a plant pathogenic nematode. It is an important cause of disease in daffodils (Narcissus).

References

Bibliography

External links 
 Nemaplex, University of California - Aphelenchoides subtenuis

Agricultural pest nematodes
subtenuis
Nematodes described in 1926